I-35 was an Imperial Japanese Navy B1 type submarine. Completed and commissioned in 1942, she served in World War II, operating in the Aleutian Islands campaign and the Battle of Tarawa before she was sunk in November 1943.

Construction and commissioning

I-35 was laid down on 2 September 1940 by Mitsubishi at Kobe, Japan, with the name Submarine No. 143. Renamed I-45 by the time she was launched on 24 September 1941, she was renamed I-35 on 1 November 1941. She was completed and commissioned on 31 August 1942.

Service history

Work-ups
Upon commissioning, I-35 was attached to the Kure Naval District and proceeded from Kobe to Kure. On 1 September 1942, the Japanese activated the Kure Submarine Flotilla, and that day I-35 and the submarine  were assigned to the new flotilla, with I-35 as the flagship of the flotilla's commander, Rear Admiral Tadashige Daigo. I-34 replaced her as the flagship on 4 September 1942.

From 14 to 21 September 1942, I-34 and I-35 conducted work-ups in the Harima Nada in the Seto Inland Sea, during which a Yokosuka E14Y1 (Allied reporting name "Glen") floatplane assigned to I-35 was damaged beyond repair during launch-and-recovery exercises on 19 September 1942. The two submarines departed the Harima Nada on 21 September and returned to Kure on 23 September 1942. I-35 put to sea again on 6 October 1942 in company with I-34 and the depot ship Santos Maru to conduct joint exercises in the Suo Nada and the Iyo Nada in the Seto Inland Sea, returning to Kure on 13 October 1942. On 18 October 1942, she carried out torpedo attack exercises against a moving target and refueling exercises with Santos Maru. She again got underway from Kure on 19 October 1942 with I-34 and Santos Maru for joint exercises in the Iyo Nada and Bungo Strait, returning to Kure on 28 October 1942.

Aleutian Islands campaign

On 15 November 1942, I-34 and I-35 were reassigned to the Northern Force in the 5th Fleet for service in the Aleutian Islands campaign. They departed Kure in company on 28 November 1942 bound for Ōminato in northern Honshu, where they arrived on 1 December 1942. On 2 December 1942, I-35 got back underway to transport supplies to the Japanese garrison on Kiska in the Aleutian Islands. She completed her patrol on 14 December and arrived at Paramushiro in the Kuril Islands on 20 December 1942.

On 25 December 1942, I-35 set out from Paramushiro on another supply run to Kiska, calling there briefly on 31 December 1942 to discharge her cargo before moving to a patrol area in the Bering Sea northeast of Adak Island. On 7 January 1943, she received orders to divert to an  area in the Bering Sea northeast of Attu to search for American cruisers that Japanese forces had sighted there. She did not find them, and on 10 January 1943 she moved to a patrol area in the North Pacific Ocean south of Kiska. She visited Kiska from 17 to 18 January, then got back underway to patrol in the North Pacific south of Kiska and Amchitka. The light cruiser  and destroyer  steamed through her patrol on their way to Kiska carrying supplies and sighted what they thought was an American submarine on 23 January 1943, raising a concern that their supply mission had been compromised and prompting them to abort it and return to base, not realizing until later that the submarine they sighted probably was I-35. I-35 moved to a new patrol area north of Constantine Harbor on Amchitka on 30 January 1943, and on 14 February 1943 visited Kiska to embark a staff officer of the North Sea Defense Force and transport him to Attu. After completing her patrol, she eventually returned to Japan.

On 27 March 1943, I-35 departed Yokosuka. She arrived at Paramushiro on 1 April 1943 and was reassigned to Submarine Division 15 in the Northern Force that day. She got underway from Paramushiro on 3 April 1943 for her third supply run to Kiska, which she visited on 8 April to unload four tons of cargo and disembark staff officers of the 51st Base Force. She departed Kiska the same day and reached Paramushiro on 13 April 1943.

I-35 departed Paramushiro on 16 April 1943 to make her first supply run to Attu, where she delivered supplies and ammunition and disembarked several Imperial Japanese Army staff officers on 20 April 1943 before getting back underway the same day to return to Paramushiro, which she reached on 24 April 1943. She put to sea again on 27 April 1943 for her fourth supply run to Kiska, where she unloaded her cargo on 1 May 1943. She returned to Paramushiro on 5 May 1943.

The Battle of Attu began when U.S forces landed on Attu on 11 May 1943, and I-35 got underway for the Attu area. As Phelps was about to attack, the submarine suddenly changed speed and bearing, apparently attempting evasive maneuvers. Phelps dropped two depth charges, then lost contact. She regained contact at 15:30 and dropped five  and four  depth charges. Nearby, the light minelayer  signaled confirmation that Phelps had hit the submarine and reported that a metal drum and a small diesel oil slick had come to the surface. The identity of the submarine Phelps attacked is unknown, but it probably was either I-34 or I-35, both of which were in the area at the time. A depth charge presumably had knocked the metal drum off the submarine's deck, but no Japanese submarine was sunk in the action.

In foggy conditions on the morning of 15 May 1943, I-35 sighted Pennsylvania standing by as the attack transport  unloaded off Holtz Bay on Attu. I-35 fired torpedoes at what she identified as a light cruiser and heard two explosions. At 11:40, four torpedoes passed astern of Pennsylvania and on either side of J. Franklin Bell. Two destroyers counterattacked, dropping 58 depth charges and inflicting serious damage on I-35. I-35  called at Paramushiro from 19 to 27 May 1943, then proceeded to Kure, which she reached at 17:00 on 2 June 1943. She later moved to Kobe where repairs to her damage began on 17 June 1943.

Later operations

With her repairs complete, I-35 departed Kure in mid-September 1943 and arrived at Truk on 18 September. On 11 October 1943, she set out from Truk on a war patrol in the area of Wake Island and Hawaii, and while at sea on 16 October 1943 was reassigned to Submarine Group A. At 00:32 on 17 October 1943, the submarine , which was en route Pearl Harbor, Hawaii, after conducting a reconnaissance of Makin Island in the Gilbert Islands, sighted the conning tower of a submarine that looked to her commanding officer like that of a new-construction U.S. submarine, but he later received information that he had seen a Japanese submarine, which may have been I-35.

After patrolling near Wake Island, I-35 received orders on 23 October 1943 to move to the Hawaii area. On 20 November 1943, the Gilbert and Marshall Islands campaign began with the U.S. invasion of Tarawa and of Makin. The Japanese never heard from her again and declared her missing that day.

Loss

On 23 November 1943, I-35  crash-dived off Tarawa Atoll when an aircraft attacked her with bombs at 05:20. Undamaged, she proceeded east. She was west of Betio that afternoon when the destroyer  detected the sound of her propellers. The destroyer  joined Meade, and between 15:30 and 17:38, the two destroyers attacked I-35 with depth charges five times. After Meade made the fifth attack, I-35, which had suffered heavy damage and was leaking in a number of places,  was forced to surface and engage the destroyers with gunfire. At 17:51, Frazier rammed I-35 on her port quarter aft of her conning tower, badly damaging her own bow but rupturing I-35′s pressure hull.

The destroyers launched boats, which found four survivors of I-35 in the water. One of them opened fire on an approaching boat crew, which returned fire and killed him, but the boats rescued the other three. The three survivors said that they believed that I-35 had been in combat with two cruisers, that the cruisers had launched two floatplanes, and that the floatplanes had bombed the submarine, with one bomb striking the ammunition box for her  deck gun.

On 10 January 1944, the Imperial Japanese Navy — unaware that the destroyers had rescued three survivors — declared I-35 to be presumed lost with all hands in the Gilbert Islands area. She was stricken from the Navy list on 10 April 1944.

Notes

Sources
 Hackett, Bob & Kingsepp, Sander.  IJN Submarine I-35: Tabular Record of Movement.  Retrieved on August 26, 2020.

Type B1 submarines
Ships built by Mitsubishi Heavy Industries
1941 ships
World War II submarines of Japan
Ships of the Aleutian Islands campaign
Japanese submarines lost during World War II
Submarines sunk by United States warships
Maritime incidents in November 1943
World War II shipwrecks in the Pacific Ocean